Joseph Haas (19 March 1879 – 30 March 1960) was a German late romantic composer and music teacher.

Biography
He was born in Maihingen, near Nördlingen to teacher Alban Haas from his second marriage, being half-brother to the theologian and historian Alban Haas. At an early age he came into contact with music. He became a teacher himself and taught from 1897 to 1904 in Lauingen near the Danube.

In his effort to pursue his musical inclination, he met Max Reger, with whom he took private lessons from 1904 in Munich. He later followed him to Leipzig in 1907 to study music at the Leipzig Conservatory. Among his teachers were Karl Straube and Adolf Ruthardt. In 1909 Haas finished his studies. In 1911, having had his first success as a composer and having won an Arthur Nikisch scholarship, he became teacher of composition at the Stuttgart Conservatory, where he was named professor in 1916. From 1921 he taught at the Akademie für Tonkunst in Munich (today Hochschule für Musik und Theater München); he was professor there from 1924 to 1950.

In 1921, together with Paul Hindemith and Heinrich Burkard, he established the Donaueschinger Kammermusikaufführungen zur Förderung zeitgenössischer Tonkunst.

In 1930, he became a member of the Prussian Academy of Arts in Berlin.

After the Second World War, he became president of the Munich Hochschule für Musik und Theater, a position which he held until he became Emeritus Professor in 1950 and led the school's reconstruction after 1945.

He died in Munich and was buried in the Munich Waldfriedhof.

Importance

As a composer
The work of Haas was entirely based on tonality. At first, he was strongly influenced by his mentor Max Reger, whose language of polyphony and harmony also featured in Haas's music.

During his lifetime, Haas was a successful and well known composer. In 1954, for his 75th birthday, numerous celebratory festivals took place in both West and East Germany. After his death, the presence of his works in concerts has dramatically decreased.

In 1949, the composer's friend Rupert Egenberger established the Joseph-Haas-Gesellschaft, dedicated to Haas and his work.

Selected works 

Stage works

 Die Bergkönigin (op. 70; 1927), music for a Christmas play 3 acts by Franziska Rodenstock
  (op. 90; 1934–37), opera in 3 acts. libretto: Ludwig Strecker, premiere 24 November 1937 Staatstheater Kassel, conducted by Robert Heger
  (op. 93; 1940–43), comic opera in 4 acts, libretto: Ludwig Strecker, premiere 2 July 1944 Semperoper, conducted by Karl Elmendorff

Oratorios
 Die heilige Elisabeth (op. 84)
 Christnacht (op. 85)
 Das Lebensbuch Gottes (op. 87)
 Das Lied von der Mutter (op. 91)
 Das Jahr im Lied (op. 103)
 Die Seligen (op. 106)

Song cycles
 Sechs Krippenlieder (op. 49).
 Unterwegs (op. 65) after Hermann Hesse
 Gesänge an Gott (op. 68) after Jakob Kneip

Masses, sacred music

 Eine Deutsche Singmesse (op. 60)
 Speyerer Domfestmesse (op. 80)
 Christ-König-Messe (op. 88)
 Münchener Liebfrauenmesse (op. 96)
 Te Deum (op. 100)
 Totenmesse (op. 101)
 Deutsche Weihnachtsmesse (op. 105)
 Deutsche Chormesse (op. 108)

Orchestral works
 Heitere Serenade (op. 41)
 Variationen und Rondo über ein altdeutsches Volkslied (op. 45)
 Variationensuite über ein altes Rokokothema (op. 64)
 Ouvertüre zu einem frohen Spiel (op. 95)

Chamber music
 Streichquartett g-Moll (op. 8)
 Violinsonate h-Moll (op. 21)
 Divertimento D-Dur (op. 22) for string trio
 Waldhornsonate F-Dur (op. 29)
 Divertimento C-Dur (op. 30a) for string quartet
 Kammertrio a-Moll (op. 38) for two violins and piano
 Grillen (op. 40) for violin and piano
 Streichquartett A-Dur (op. 50)

Piano music
 Wichtelmännchen (op. 27)
 Gespenster (op. 34)
 Hausmärchen (op. 35, op. 43, op. 53)
 Eulenspiegeleien (op. 39)
 Alte unnennbare Tage Elegien für Klavier (op. 42)
 Sonate a-Moll (op. 46)
 Zwei Sonaten (D-Dur, a-Moll) (op. 61)
 Vier Sonatinen (C-Dur, d-Moll, G-Dur, F-Dur) (op. 94)
 Klangspiele, Zehn kleine Stücke für Klavier (op. 99)

Organ music
 Drei Präludien und Fugen (c-Moll, g-Moll, D-Dur) (op. 11)
 Sonate c-Moll (op. 12)
 Suite d-Moll (op. 20)
 Suite A-Dur (op. 25)

As a teacher
Haas was an important music teacher. Among his numerous students are composers and conductors, such as Otto Jochum (1898–1969), Karl Gustav Fellerer, Eugen Jochum, Karl Amadeus Hartmann, Karl Höller, Philipp Mohler (1908–1982), Cesar Bresgen, Ernst Kutzer (1918–2008), and Wolfgang Sawallisch, and Margarete Schweikert.

References
 Translated from the German Wikipedia article

External links
 Joseph Haas site
 Biography
 

1879 births
1960 deaths
German Romantic composers
Academic staff of the University of Music and Performing Arts Munich
Commanders Crosses of the Order of Merit of the Federal Republic of Germany
Burials at Munich Waldfriedhof
Academic staff of the State University of Music and Performing Arts Stuttgart
German male classical composers
20th-century German male musicians
19th-century German male musicians